The 1989 New Jersey General Assembly election was held on November 7, 1989.

The elections coincided with Jim Florio's landslide election as Governor of New Jersey. As a result, Democrats won back the Assembly for the first time since 1983.

Incumbents not running for re-election

Democratic 
 Dennis L. Riley (District 4) (lost party support)
 Alan Karcher (District 19) (ran for Governor)

Republican 
 John T. Hendrickson Jr. (District 9) (resigned September 1)
 Joseph A. Palaia (District 11) (ran for State Senate)
 Peter J. Genova (District 21) (stepped aside after running mate lost gubernatorial primary)

Summary of races 
Voters in each legislative district elect two members to the New Jersey General Assembly.

District 1

General election

District 2

General election

District 3

General election

District 4

General election

District 5

General election

District 6

General election

District 7

General election

District 8

General election

District 9

General election

District 10

General election

District 11

General election

District 12

General election

District 13

General election

District 14

General election

District 15

General election

District 16

General election

District 17

General election

District 18

General election

District 19

General election

District 20

General election

District 21

General election

District 22

General election

District 23

General election

District 24

General election

District 25

General election

District 26

General election

District 27

General election

District 28

General election

District 29

General election

District 30

General election

District 31

General election

District 32

General election

District 33

General election

District 34

General election

District 35

General election

District 36

General election

District 37

General election

District 38

General election

District 39

General election

District 40

General election

Notes

References 

1989
New Jersey General Assembly
1989 New Jersey elections